Charles Boyd could refer to: 

Charles Boyd (archdeacon) (1842–1914), Archdeacon of the Anglican Diocese of Colombo
Charles Anthony Boyd (1959–1999), American serial killer
Charles G. Boyd (1938–2022), United States Air Force general
Chuck Boyd (1942–1991), American photographer

See also
Charles Boyd Homestead Group, pioneer ranch complex in Deschutes County, Oregon